The fourth season of Monk originally aired in the United States on USA Network from July 8, 2005, to March 17, 2006.  It consisted of 16 episodes.  Tony Shalhoub, Traylor Howard, Ted Levine, and Jason Gray-Stanford reprised their roles as the main characters.  A DVD of the season was released on June 27, 2006.

Crew
Andy Breckman continued his tenure as show runner. Executive producers for the season included Breckman, David Hoberman, and series star Tony Shalhoub.  NBC Universal Television Studio was the primary production company backing the show.  Randy Newman's theme ("It's a Jungle Out There") continued to be used, while Jeff Beal's original instrumental theme could be heard in some episodes.  Directors for the season included Randall Zisk, Jerry Levine, and Andrei Belgrader.  Writers for the season included Andy Breckman, David Breckman, Hy Conrad, Daniel Dratch, Joe Toplyn, and Tom Scharpling.

During the airing of this season, writer Lee Goldberg published his first Monk mystery novel, Mr. Monk Goes to the Firehouse.

Cast

All four primary cast members from the end of the season three returned. This included Tony Shalhoub as Adrian Monk, the OCD "defective detective," Traylor Howard as Natalie Teeger, his assistant, Ted Levine as Captain Leland Stottlemeyer of the SFPD Robbery and Homicide Division, and Jason Gray-Stanford as Lieutenant Randy Disher. The character of Dr. Charles Kroger, Monk's ever-needed psychiatrist, was reprised by Stanley Kamel in five episodes, a number surpassed only by Emmy Clarke as Julie Teeger, Natalie's daughter, who appeared in seven. Melora Hardin continued to play Trudy Monk, Monk's deceased wife, and John Turturro returned as Ambrose Monk, Monk's agoraphobic brother, after a one-season absence.  Jarrad Paul portrayed Monk's annoying upstairs neighbor, Kevin Dorfman. Michael Cavanaugh and Holland Taylor made their first appearance as Bob and Peggy Davenport (Natalie's ultra-rich parents), and Glenne Headly (Karen Stottlemeyer) made her exit from the series, after her character divorced the captain.

Episodes

Awards and nominations

Emmy Awards
Outstanding Actor – Comedy Series (Tony Shalhoub for "Mr. Monk Bumps His Head", won)
Outstanding Guest Actress – Comedy Series (Laurie Metcalf for playing "Cora" in "Mr. Monk Bumps His Head", nominated)

References

Monk (TV series)
2005 American television seasons
2006 American television seasons
Monk (TV series) seasons